Soft Targets is the first full-length album by the blues rock band Earl Greyhound. It was released in August 2006 by Some Records. Drummer Christopher Bear left the band just after the album was recorded, and was replaced by Ricc Sheridan.

Track listing

Personnel
Matt Whyte (guitar, lead vocals)
Kamara Thomas (bass, backing vocals, lead vocals on tracks 7 and 8)
Christopher Bear (drums)

References

Earl Greyhound albums
2006 debut albums